Magomed Rashidovich Geliskhanov (born 12 August 1986) is a former Russian professional football player.

Club career
He played in the Russian Football National League for FC Angusht Nazran in 2006.

External links
 

1986 births
Living people
Russian footballers
Association football midfielders
FC Angusht Nazran players